Doriopsilla carneola is a species of dorid nudibranch, a colourful sea slug, a shell-less marine gastropod mollusc in the family Dendrodorididae.

Distribution
This species was described from a specimen collected at Port Jackson, New South Wales, Australia.

Description
This nudibranch can grow as large as 50 mm. The mantle can vary in colour from translucent white to deep claret, usually with a few white patches or spots. The rhinophores and gills are similar in colour to the mantle.

References

Dendrodorididae
Gastropods described in 1864